Orycteocetus is an extinct genus of sperm whale from the Miocene of the northern Atlantic Ocean.

Classification
Orycterocetus is a member of Physeteroidea closely related to crown-group sperm whales. The type species, O. quadratidens, was first named by Joseph Leidy on the basis of two teeth, two partial mandibular rami, and a rib from Neogene deposits of Virginia. Two more species were subsequently described, O. cornutidens Leidy 1856 and O. crocodilinus Cope, 1868, the latter from the middle Miocene Calvert Formation.

References

Sources
 Cenozoic Seas: The View From Eastern North America by Edward J. Petuch
 Marine Mammals: Evolutionary Biology by Annalisa Berta and James L. Sumich

Sperm whales
Miocene cetaceans
Prehistoric toothed whales
Prehistoric cetacean genera
Extinct mammals of North America